Akshat Anjaria or Hakka  (born 21 April 2005) is an Indian dancer who came into prominence by showcasing his talent in the Bengali dance reality show Dance Bangla Dance. He then took part in India's reality show India's Got Talent and became an overnight sensation. Singh was also a contestant of Jhalak Dikhhla Jaa (season 7). He debuted as an actor in the Malayalam film Ayal Njanalla and he also is in a Tamil language film lakshmi

Personal life
Singh lives in Mumbai and studies in 12th grade in Ryan International School Kandivali.
Singh admitted to one of his interviews that he is an ardent fan of actor Salman Khan.

Career
Akshat's first work was in 2011 on the Bengali channel Zee Bangla, where he performed in Dance Bangla Dance. In 2014, he made his appearance on American talk show The Ellen DeGeneres Show, 
before later participating on India's Got Talent. His dancing style proved popular, with the video of his performance on YouTube with five hundred thousand (5 lakh) views. Singh's popularity soon landed him a role performing for a Japanese television commercial advertisement of Pari Pari Curry. On 27 August 2017, he appeared on the Australian version of the variety show Little Big Shots, with the video highlight of this appearance achieving just under 35 million views on YouTube. In 2019, he auditioned for Britain's Got Talent and danced his way to winning a golden buzzer, though failed to reach the final.

Filmography

References

Indian male dancers
2005 births
Artists from Kolkata
Dancers from West Bengal
Living people
Britain's Got Talent contestants